Paramour may refer to:

 A secret lover
 Extramarital sex partner
 Intimate relationship hidden partner
 The Paramours, a U.S. musical quintet
 Paramour (Cirque du Soleil), musical theatre Broadway residency show
 Paramour Mansion, Silver Lake district, Los Angeles, California, USA; a historic mansion
 Paramour Rupes, a ridge on the planet Mercury
 , a British Royal Navy ship name

See also

 
 
 
 Paramour rights, rights of a slave-owner in the sexual use of their slaves
 The Paramour Sessions (2006 album) album by Papa Roach
 Paramor (disambiguation)
 Paramore (disambiguation)
 Parramore (disambiguation)
 Par (disambiguation)
 Amour (disambiguation)